This is a list of all British ship classes that served in World War II. 
This list includes all British ship classes including those which did not serve with the Royal Navy or British military in general.

Aircraft carriers

Fleet carriers

Light aircraft carriers 

 
 
 
 1942 Design Light Fleet Carrier

Escort carrier

Merchant aircraft carriers 

 Merchant aircraft carriers (MAC)  were grain ships or tankers with a flying deck mounted on top; they were operated by civilian crew with some naval personnel.

Seaplane carriers 

 HMS Pegasus - used as training ship and aircraft transport
 HMS Albatross - ex-RAN, converted to "Landing Ship (Engineering)" to be repair ship for invasion of France

Catapult equipped ships 

 Fighter catapult ship - convoy escorts fitted with a catapult to launch a fighter
CAM ship - civilian ships equipped with a catapult to launch a fighter

Battleships

Battlecruisers

Cruisers 

Heavy cruisers

Light cruisers

Armed merchant cruisers

Armed merchant cruisers

Monitors

Destroyers

Destroyer leaders 

 Thornycroft type destroyer leader
 Admiralty type flotilla leader

Destroyers 

  - HMS Skate only

Frigates

Corvettes

Sloops

Minelayers

  - minelaying cruiser
 
 
  - auxiliary minelayer
  - auxiliary minelayer
  - auxiliary minelayer
  - auxiliary minelayer
 
  - auxiliary minelayer
  - also used as fast transports

Minesweepers

 
 
  – MMS stands for motor minesweeper.
 
 
  – known as Catherine class in British service

Submarines

 H-class submarine
 L-class submarine
 
 
 
 S-class submarine
  (also known as the Thames class)
  minelaying submarines
 T-class submarine (also known as the Triton class)
 U-class submarine
 P611-class submarine
 V-class submarine

Midget submarines

Naval trawlers

 Mersey-class trawler

 
 
 
Round Table-class trawler

Small armed boats 
Motor Launch
Fairmile A motor launch
Fairmile B motor launch
 Harbour Defence Motor Launch
Motor torpedo boats 
Vosper 73 ft motor torpedo boat
 Fairmile D motor torpedo boat
 Motor gun boats
 Fairmile C motor gun boat
Steam Gun Boat
High-speed launch
High-speed launches type boats or HSL were operated only by the Royal Air Force Marine Branch to rescue downed RAF aircrew at sea

Type Two 63 ft HSL

Other

Ocean boarding vessels

Gunboats

Salvage vessels

Repair and maintenance ships

Boom defence

Tugs

Several classes of Admiralty tug were operated as well as other vessels obtained 
 Rescue tugs operated by His Majesty's Rescue Tug Service and civilians through Ministry of War Transport
 Saint 
 Rollicker 
 Brigand 
 Assurance
 Favourite
 Bustler
 Nimble
 Envoy
 Director
 Harbour tugs, operated by Royal Maritime Auxiliary Service,
 Robust
 West
 Alligator

Auxiliary and merchant ships

General purpose ships 

 Empire ship
Empire F coaster
Channel Tanker (CHANT)
Heavy lift ships
"Ocean"-type tanker
Norwegian-type tanker
Wave-class oiler
Three Island type cargo ship
Malta type cargo ship
Tank landing ships
Ocean going tugs
Convoy rescue ship
Empire Maple-class tug
Ramped cargo lighter

Oilers and tankers 

Dale-class oiler
Ranger-class tanker
Sprite-class tanker
Ol-class tanker
War-class oiler
Spa-class coastal water carriers
Fresh-class water tank vessels

Stores
Fort-class stores ship

Amphibious warfare vessels 

 Landing ship, infantry
Landing Craft Assault
Fairmile H landing craft
LCPL
 LCM 1
Landing Ship, Tank
Maracaibo-class tank landing ship
''Boxer-class

Headquarters ships
LST1 tank landing ship - later  fighter direction ship
Headquarters ship

Civilian ships 

 Little Ships of Dunkirk

See also
List of ship classes of World War II

Notes

References

Conway's All the World's Fighting Ships

 Classes
Ship classes
Ship classes. World War II
World War II
Lists of World War II ships